The San Raffaele Hospital (also Istituto scientifico universitario San Raffaele or ospedale San Raffaele, HSR or OSR) is a university hospital situated in Segrate, the Province of Milan, Italy.  It was founded in 1969 by don Luigi Maria Verzé, president of "San Raffaele del Monte Tabor Foundation".  The facility is connected to the Milan Metro by the MeLA people mover.

The hospital is affiliated with the School of Medicine and the School of Nursing of the Vita-Salute San Raffaele University.

Facility

Structure
The HSR is divided in different sectors:
 Sector A
 Sector B
 Sector C (Emergency Department)
 Sector D
 Sector G (Outpatient Clinic)
 Sector Q
 Sector R (Central Admittance, Radiology, Endoscopy)
 DiMeR (Department of Riabilitative Medicine)
 San Raffaele Turro (SRT)
 HSR Resnati

Departments & Wards

Arrhythmology Department
 Arrhythmology and Electrophysiology

Cardio-Thoracic-Vascular Department
 Clinical Cardiology
 Cardiac Catheterization Laboratory
 Cardiac Surgery
 Thoracic Surgery
 Vascular Surgery
 Cardiothoracic Intensive Care Unit
 Coronary Care Unit
 Rehabilitation - Functional Rieducation Service

General and Specialistic Surgery Department
 Esophagus-Gastric and Colo-Rectal Surgery
 Endocrino-pancreatic Surgery
 Hepato-biliary Surgery
 Orthopedics and Traumatology
 General Intensive Care Unit
 Gastroenterology and G.I. Endoscopy
 Day-Surgery Center

Head-Neck District Department
 Neurosurgery
 Ophthalmology
 E.N.T.
 Neuroradiology
 Neurosurgical Intensive Care Unit

Infectious Diseases Department
 Infectious Diseases
 Day Hospital Infectious Diseases

Maternal Department
 Gynaecology
 Obstetrics
 Birth Sciences Day-Surgery
 Pediatrics
 Neonatology - Neonatal Intensive Care Unit
 IME

Specialistic and Internal Medicine Department
 Endocrinology - Diabetology
 Allergology
 Nephrology
 Transplants Unit

Neurological Department
 Neurology - Stroke Unit
 Neurorehabilitation
 Neurophysiology

Clinical Neurosciences Department
 Neurology - San Raffaele Turro
 Sleep Center
 Psychiatry
 Clinical Psychology

Oncology Department
 Oncology
 Hematology - Bone Marrow Transplant Unit
 Medical Oncology Service
 Radiotherapy - Nuclear Medicine
 Oncological Day-Hospital - Arianne Line

Radiology Department
 Radiology 
 Radiology - San Raffaele Turro

Urological Department
 Urology 
 Urology - San Raffaele Turro

Emergency Department
 E.R. - Trauma Center

Other Wards & Services
 Blood Center
 Dermatology
 Laboratory Medicine
 Morgue
 Odontoiatry
 Pathology
 Pharmacy
 Plastic Aesthetic and Reconstructive Surgery

External links
 San Raffaele Hospital - official website
 Vita-Salute San Raffaele University
 Hotels near San Raffaele Hospital

Hospital buildings completed in 1969
Hospitals established in 1969
Hospitals in Milan
1969 establishments in Italy